DAR Constitution Hall is a concert hall located at 1776 D Street NW, near the White House in Washington, D.C. It was built in 1929 by the Daughters of the American Revolution to house its annual convention when membership delegations outgrew Memorial Continental Hall. Later, the two buildings were connected by a third structure housing the DAR Museum, administrative offices, and genealogical library. DAR Constitution Hall is still owned and operated by the National Society of Daughters of the American Revolution. It was designated a National Historic Landmark in 1985.  It has been a major cultural center of the city since its construction, and houses its largest auditorium.

Description

The hall was designed by architect John Russell Pope and is located at 1776 D Street NW, just east of the Department of the Interior, between the American Red Cross and the Organization of American States, across from the Ellipse in front of the White House. The hall seats 3,702, with 2,208 in the tiers and 1,234 on the orchestra level. Additionally, 52 boxes (containing five seats each) separate the orchestra from the tiers, including one Presidential box.

The Hall is a Neoclassical style structure, faced with Alabama limestone and houses the largest auditorium in Washington. This auditorium is unusual with its U-shaped balcony, necessary to provide the enormous amount of seating required by the program while retaining practical sight distances. The auditorium holds a three-manual, 40 rank Skinner pipe organ, Opus number 757.

History

From 1930 until the opening of the John F. Kennedy Center for the Performing Arts in 1971, Constitution Hall was home to the National Symphony Orchestra and the city's principal venue for touring classical music soloists and orchestras. Some of the earliest mainstream country music concerts were also held there, organized by Connie B. Gay. The National Geographic Society presented sold-out film lectures, filling the hall for many decades, three evenings a week until about 1990 when they moved to the National Geographic theater near 16th and M Streets, NW. The free Air Force Band Sunday concerts, featuring famous guest artists, are popular, as is the band's special Christmas gala show.

In 1939, the DAR denied African-American singer Marian Anderson the opportunity to sing at the Hall, causing First Lady Eleanor Roosevelt to resign her membership in protest. Instead, Anderson performed (with the aid of Eleanor Roosevelt and her husband, President Franklin D. Roosevelt) a critically acclaimed open-air concert on Easter Sunday, April 9, 1939, on the steps of the Lincoln Memorial in Washington, D.C. She sang before a crowd of more than 75,000 people and a radio audience in the millions. In 1941, Paul Robeson was also blocked from performing at Constitution Hall on the grounds of his race. The organization would later reverse its racial exclusion policy and Anderson performed at Constitution Hall for an American Red Cross war relief benefit in 1943; in 1964, she chose it as the first venue of her farewell concert tour.

Every U.S. president since Calvin Coolidge has attended at least one event at the theater.

Events
The Hall is used for concerts, school commencements, conferences, corporate meetings, televised events and other performances.  The Hall hosted the 1939 premiere of Mr. Smith Goes to Washington and was the recording site for Eddie Murphy Delirious in 1983; John Denver's Christmas In Concert in 1996, Whitney Houston's Classic Whitney concerts in 1997; Martin Lawrence Live: Runteldat in 2002; Chris Rock's HBO special and album Never Scared in 2004 and Robin Williams HBO special Weapons of Self Destruction in 2009. It has hosted tapings of TV game shows Jeopardy! in 1997, 2004, 2012 and 2016, Wheel of Fortune in 2000 and 2001, the newscast Buletin Utama in 2000, and the 2004, 2005, 2007, and 2008 Annual Meetings of the International Monetary Fund and the World Bank Group.

See also
List of concert halls
List of National Historic Landmarks in Washington, D.C.

References

External links

DAR Constitution Hall
DAR Constitution Hall on Google Street View

Music venues in Washington, D.C.
Concert halls in the United States
National Historic Landmarks in Washington, D.C.
Buildings and structures completed in 1929
Genealogical libraries in the United States
John Russell Pope buildings
Daughters of the American Revolution
Neoclassical architecture in Washington, D.C.
1929 establishments in Washington, D.C.
Event venues on the National Register of Historic Places in Washington, D.C.